Lisa LeBlanc (born August 13, 1990), is a Canadian singer-songwriter and banjoist, known for her enthusiastic "trash folk" performances.

Early life
LeBlanc was born in Rosaireville, New Brunswick.  She is of Acadian heritage, and comes from a family of music lovers.

Musical career
LeBlanc composed her first pieces around the age of fourteen. She was playing at local events and Miramichi's O'Donaghues bar, with her mother watching her because she was underage. LeBlanc was recognized as an outstanding guitarist and a promising singer-songwriter when she won the Festival international de la chanson de Granby in September 2010.  This juried award brought her to the attention of the country's francophone media. She has also played at the 2011 Coup de cœur francophone, at the FrancoFolies of Montreal and at the Festival d'été de Québec.

The majority of LeBlanc's first album was written in Rosaireville, in Granby during her studies at l'École nationale de la chanson as well as in Montreal, where she was living. Released in March on Bonsound Records, the album was recorded by Louis-Jean Cormier of Karkwa at Studio Piccolo.

LeBlanc's self-titled album Lisa LeBlanc was released in 2012. It has been certified platinum by Music Canada. The album became best known for the single "Aujourd'hui ma vie c'est d'la marde" ("Today My Life Is Shit").

In 2014, LeBlanc released Highways, Heartaches and Time Well Wasted, an English EP, which debuted at number seven on the Canadian Albums Chart, selling 3,400 copies.

Why You Wanna Leave, Runaway Queen?, LeBlanc's third album, which includes both French and English titles including a thrash-folk cover of Motörhead's classic heavy metal song "Ace of Spades", was released on September 30, 2016. The album was shortlisted for the 2017 Polaris Music Prize.

In 2020, under the pseudonym Belinda, LeBlanc released It's Not a Game, It's a Lifestyle, a five-song EP of disco songs about bingo. She followed up with the full album Chiac Disco, released in March 2022.

Chiac Disco was a Juno Award nominee for Francophone Album of the Year at the Juno Awards of 2023.

Discography

References

1990 births
Living people
Musicians from New Brunswick
Acadian people
French-language singers of Canada
Canadian women singer-songwriters
Canadian folk singer-songwriters
Canadian women rock singers
Canadian folk rock musicians
People from Northumberland County, New Brunswick
21st-century Canadian women singers
Canadian Folk Music Award winners
Canadian women folk singers
Félix Award winners